Mickaël Akim Orinel (born 27 July 1986) is a French professional footballer who plays as a midfielder for Championnat National 2 club Fréjus Saint-Raphaël.

Career
Born in Arles and of Algerian descent, Orinel began his career in the youth ranks of Saint-Étienne. In 2006, he left the club and joined CFA side Orléans. After two seasons at the club, he signed with another CFA side, Fréjus Saint-Raphaël. He spent three seasons at the club, including winning promotion to the Championnat National.

On 5 May 2011, Orinel signed a two-year contract with Ligue 2 side Châteauroux.

References

External links
 
 
 

Living people
1987 births
People from Arles
Sportspeople from Bouches-du-Rhône
Association football midfielders
French footballers
AS Saint-Étienne players
ÉFC Fréjus Saint-Raphaël players
LB Châteauroux players
USM Alger players
US Orléans players
French sportspeople of Algerian descent
Championnat National players
Ligue 2 players
Championnat National 3 players
Algerian Ligue Professionnelle 1 players
Championnat National 2 players
Footballers from Provence-Alpes-Côte d'Azur